Ramesh Chand Tomar (born 15 July 1948) is an Indian politician. He was member of 10th, 11th, 12th and 13th Lok Sabha, as BJP representative from Ghaziabad seat of Uttar Pradesh.

He lost his seat in the 2017 Uttar Pradesh Assembly election to Aaslam Choudhary of the Bahujan Samaj Party.

References

1948 births
Living people
People from Hapur
Indian National Congress politicians
Bharatiya Janata Party politicians from Uttar Pradesh
India MPs 1991–1996
India MPs 1996–1997
India MPs 1998–1999
India MPs 1999–2004
Lok Sabha members from Uttar Pradesh